Spathodea is a genus in the plant family Bignoniaceae. The single species it contains, Spathodea campanulata, is commonly known as the African tulip tree. It has been nominated as among 100 of the "World's Worst" invaders.

This tree is planted extensively as an ornamental tree throughout the tropics and is much appreciated for its very showy reddish-orange or crimson (rarely yellow), campanulate flowers. The generic name comes from the Ancient Greek words σπαθη (spathe) and οιδα (oida), referring to the spathe-like calyx. It was identified by Europeans in 1787 on the Gold Coast of Africa.

Description

The flower bud is ampule-shaped and contains water. People sometimes play with these buds because of their ability to squirt water. The sap sometimes stains yellow on fingers and clothes. The open flowers are cup-shaped and hold rain and dew, making them attractive to many species of birds.

Flower anatomy
The African tulip tree flower produces large flamboyant reddish-orange flowers that have approximately five petals and are 8-15 cm long. The flowers are bisexual and zygomorphic. These are displayed in a terminal corymb-like raceme inflorescence. Its pedicel is approximately 6 cm long. This flower also has a yellow margin and throat. The pistil can be found at center of four stamens that is inserted on the corolla tube.  This flower has a slender ovary that is superior and is two celled. The seeds of this tree are flat, thin, and broadly winged.

Species associations
In Neotropical gardens and parks, their nectar is popular with many hummingbirds, such as the black-throated mango (Anthracothorax nigricollis), the black jacobin (Florisuga fusca), or the gilded hummingbird (Hylocharis chrysura). The wood of the tree is soft and is used for nesting by many hole-building birds such as barbets.  Unfortunately the flowers have a natural defence killing bees, and it is thought various other species who harvest its pollen.

Geographic distribution
Native to: Angola, Ethiopia, Ghana, Kenya, Sudan, Tanzania, Uganda, Zambia
Exotic in: Australia, Bangladesh,Brazil, Colombia, Costa Rica, Cuba, Fiji, India, Jamaica, Mauritius, Mexico, Papua New Guinea, Puerto Rico, Sri Lanka, Zanzibar, Hawaii, Philippines

It has become an invasive species in many tropical areas, such as Hawaii, Queensland (Australia), Fiji, Papua New Guinea, South Africa and the wet and intermediate zones of Sri Lanka.

Spathodea campanulata is a declared class 3 pest species in Queensland, Australia, under the Land Protection (Pest and Stock Route Management) Act 2002. It is known to be toxic to Australian native stingless bees, such as Lipotriches (Austronomia) flavoviridis.

Pests and diseases
In Uganda, two lepidopteran species, two termite species, and one bark beetle attack S. campanulata. In Puerto Rico nine insect species in the orders Hemiptera, Hymenoptera, Lepidoptera, and Thysanoptera have been reported as feeding on various parts of S. campanulata. The species is quite susceptible to butt and heart rot; wood of the tree rots quickly when in contact with the ground.

Use
Its wood is too weak for construction use but ideal enough for boxes and toothpicks. Fijian children sometimes use its flower buds as water pistols.

Common names

Afrikaans: , 
Bangla: 
English: African tulip tree, fountain tree, Nandi flame, Nile flame, squirt tree, tulip tree, Uganda flame, Flame Tree of Thika
Fijian: , 
French: 
Hindi: 
Kannada: 
Luganda: 
Luhya: 
Malay: 
Malayalam: African Poomaram
Sinhala: ,  
Swahili: , 
Telugu: , 
Tamil: 
Trade name: Nandi flame

Gallery

Footnotes

References
  (2005): Beija-flores (Aves, Trochilidae) e seus recursos florais em uma área urbana do Sul do Brasil  [Hummingbirds (Aves, Trochilidae) and their flowers in an urban area of southern Brazil]. [Portuguese with English abstract] Revista Brasileira de Zoologia 22(1): 51–59.  PDF fulltext
 http://www.issg.org/database/species/ecology.asp?si=75

External links
 
 

Bignoniaceae
Flora of East Tropical Africa
Flora of Northeast Tropical Africa
Flora of South Tropical Africa
Trees of Africa
Trees of Angola
Trees of Ethiopia
Flora of Ghana
Flora of Sudan
Flora of Zambia
Afrotropical realm flora
Garden plants of Africa
Ornamental trees
Invasive plant species in Sri Lanka
Monotypic Lamiales genera
Trees of Guatemala